Jacob Abraham Jeremy de Villiers  (14 December 1868 – 16 September 1932) was a judge of the Appellate Division from 1920 to 1932 and Chief Justice of South Africa from 1929 to 1932.

Early life and education
De Villiers was born in Fauresmith, the son of Jacobus Johannes Luttig de Villiers, deputy sheriff at Fauresmith and his second wife, Johanna Lodewica Oberholzer. The family later moved to Winburg, where his father became the sheriff. De Villiers matriculated at Grey College in Bloemfontein, passing the Matriculation Examination in 1886 and winning two bursaries. He continued his studies at the Victoria College in Stellenbosch. De Villiers gained first place in the B.A. examination in 1889 and was awarded a William Porter Bursary.

In 1890, he went to the Netherlands to study law at the University of Amsterdam, but in July that year decided to compete for a senior bursary in law at the University of London. He completed the examination in August 1891, in which he came first and won the Senior Studentship.

Career
De Villiers was admitted to the Middle Temple in January 1893, thereby qualifying for admission to the Johannesburg Bar, where he began to practise in 1894. After the Jameson Raid, De Villiers acted as the assistant to John Wessels, in defending the Reformers in the high treason trial, following the Raid. Shortly after the trial, the Orange Free State President, M. T. Steyn appointed him Attorney General of the Orange Free State, a post he occupied for a short while. He resigned the post in 1898 and returned to the Johannesburg Bar.

When the Second Boer War broke out in October 1899, De Villiers joined the Free State forces and served as legal adviser to general Marthinus Prinsloo. During the Battle of Bothaville, on 6 November 1900, he was seriously wounded in the front lines when a bullet passed through both of his legs. He was captured by the British and deported to a POW camp in Bermuda, where he spent eighteen months. After the war he toured through England, France and Germany before returning to Johannesburg and resuming his practice in 1903.

After Britain granted self-rule to the two former Boer colonies, the Transvaal Colony held an election in February 1907. De Villiers became member of the Legislative Assembly for Maraisburg and was included in the first elected Cabinet of the Transvaal Colony as Attorney General (effectively the Minister of Justice) and Minister of Mines.

When the Union of South Africa was formed in 1910, de Villiers was not included in the first Union cabinet but was appointed the first Judge-President of the Transvaal Provincial Division and also additional Judge of Appellate Division. He became a permanent Judge of Appeal in 1920 and after the death of Sir William Solomon in 1929, he was appointed Chief Justice of the Union of South Africa and in 1931 he was made a member of the Privy Council.

Honours
De Villiers was awarded an honorary doctorate in law by the University of Stellenbosch in June 1931 and at the beginning of 1932 he was appointed chancellor of the university, but died before he could be inaugurated.

Personal life
De Villiers married the widow, Maria Jacoba Carolina Meintjies in November 1907 and they had three children. De Villiers left for Germany in April 1932 for medical treatment but died five months later in London, England.

References

South African judges
19th-century South African people
Chief justices of South Africa
1868 births
1932 deaths
Members of the Privy Council of the United Kingdom